The Bovine Sex Club is a bar on Toronto's Queen Street West strip. In operation since January 1991, the Bovine Sex Club (often shortened to 'the Bovine') has at various times found itself at the forefront of Toronto's rock, punk, alternative, and rockabilly music scenes.

History
The club opened in January 1991 with a trio of Toronto nightlife enthusiasts behind it in ownership capacity — Wesley Thuro a.k.a. Happy Dog who had already had some organizational experience with Toronto nightlife establishments having launched the all ages rave club 23 Hop just a few months earlier in 1990, colourful CFNY radio personality Chris Sheppard who in addition to achieving a measure of local fame as the voice of CFNY's weekend live-to-air broadcasts from various Toronto clubs also performed under the 'DJ Dogwhistle' moniker, and Darryl Fine.

Those who have visited the club include band members and film actors, including Bruce LaBruce.

In 2013 the club opened a rooftop patio bar known as the Tiki Bar.

Art
The Bovine's facade was built by a small group of local artists including Dave Grieveson and Great Bob Scott (also the drummer for The Look People). They worked under the creator of the Bovine, Happy Dog (real name - Wesley Thuro). The exterior and interior were an art installation made solely from discarded items.

References

External links
Bovine Sex Club
Bovine Sex Club live photo archive on Formertransformer

Music venues in Toronto
Nightclubs in Toronto
1991 establishments in Ontario